Under Southern Skies is a 1902 Australian documentary made by the Limelight Department of The Salvation Army in Australia.

It was Australia's first historical documentary.

It consisted of 38 short films and 200 slides and was presented along with a lecture. It told the story of modern Australia's history.

References

1902 films
Australian documentary films
Australian silent short films
Australian black-and-white films
Limelight Department films
1900s documentary films